Christopher John Coney (born 21 August 1945) is a former New Zealand cricketer who played two matches of first-class cricket in the 1960s.

Chris Coney is the oldest of three brothers. Jeremy Coney, who went on to captain the New Zealand Test cricket team, is the youngest. Their father worked for the Reserve Bank of New Zealand in Wellington.

A middle-order batsman and left-arm spin bowler, Chris Coney represented Wellington at under-20 and under-23 levels for several seasons in the 1960s. He played a first-class match for New Zealand Under-23s in 1965-66 and one for Wellington against the touring Australians in 1966–67.

He and his wife Judy took up organic farming at Te Puna in the Bay of Plenty region. They have four children.

References

External links
 

1945 births
Living people
Cricketers from Auckland
New Zealand cricketers
Wellington cricketers
New Zealand farmers